The John P. Grace Memorial Bridge, or the Cooper River Bridge as it was familiarly known, was a cantilever bridge that crossed the Cooper River in Charleston, South Carolina. It opened on August 8, 1929, and was built by the Cooper River Bridge Company. Shortridge Hardesty of Waddell & Hardesty, a New York City-based engineering firm, designed the bridge.

The Silas N. Pearman Bridge was opened beside it in 1966 to relieve traffic. They were both replaced by the Arthur Ravenel Jr. Bridge in 2005.

History
A group of businessmen, led by Harry F. Barkerding and Charles R. Allen, announced their plans to get a charter from the state to construct a steel bridge across the Cooper River in June 1926. The group formed the Cooper River Bridge, Inc., on June 7, 1926, with Ashmead F. Pringle as the first president. On June 8, 1926, the state issued a charter to the new company to "buy, rent, lease, build or otherwise acquire bridges across streams both intrastate and interstate, together with rights of way and right to construct and own and operate the same, and to charge tolls for passage across and enter upon such bridges, etc."

The ribbon was cut on August 8, 1929, at 1:12 p.m. by Col. James Armstrong, and between 30,000 and 50,000 people crossed the bridge during its first day. The bridge was owned by Cooper River Bridge, Inc., a private company. President of the company was John P. Grace, former mayor of Charleston. The bridge was built by a consortium of four engineering and construction firms. Construction lasted seventeen months, and the final cost of the bridge was six million dollars, to be financed by a 50-cent toll. The bridge had two  lanes. In 1946 the state bought the bridge from Cooper River Bridge, Inc., and the 50-cent toll was removed. Unfortunately the same year a freighter rammed the bridge ripping down a  section of it. Widening occurred in 1959 for a breakdown lane. Construction on the parallel Silas N. Pearman Bridge, intended to alleviate load limits on the Grace Bridge, was completed in 1966. In 1979, a third lane was added to the Grace bridge at the Charleston approach. By 1979, the bridge became functionally obsolete and there were many plans to replace the bridge, but not enough money.

Replacement

In 1995 the Grace bridge scored only a 4 out of 100 (4 percent), or an F, in safety. Arthur Ravenel Jr. ran for South Carolina Senate as a way to solve the problem. He planned for an eight-lane bridge to replace the Grace/Pearman spans of US 17. Construction started in 2001 and the new bridge opened in July 2005, at which point the Grace Bridge closed to traffic.

Demolition
After a "Burn The Bridges" run and a parade of 1929-era cars over the empty deck, demolition of the Grace Bridge began in August 2005. There had been a movement to try to sell the bridge or to place it on the National Register of Historic Places so that, after removal, it could be reassembled elsewhere, but most of the steel and concrete was either recycled or dropped into the ocean to start artificial fishing reefs. Demolition of the Grace Bridge took approximately 2 years and required closing the shipping lane for half a day as the main span was cut from the cantilever sections and lowered onto a barge below. The shipping lane was closed from 8 a.m. until 4 p.m. for the lowering of the main span. The contractor had 2-1/2 years to remove the two bridges and roads. Frank Starmer and Sparky Witte documented the progress of demolition in a book entitled End of an Era.

See also

List of bridges documented by the Historic American Engineering Record in South Carolina

References

External links

Unbuilding the Grace and Pearman Bridges A series of photo essays documenting the entire demolition process by Frank Starmer and Sparky Witte
Photographic Record of the Cooper River Bridge at the Charleston Archive at Charleston County Public Library

Bridges completed in 1929
Demolished bridges in the United States
U.S. Route 17
Historic American Engineering Record in South Carolina
History of Charleston, South Carolina
Road bridges in South Carolina
Grace
Bridges of the United States Numbered Highway System
Former toll bridges in South Carolina
Steel bridges in the United States
Cantilever bridges in the United States